The maneti was the currency of the Democratic Republic of Georgia and the Georgian Soviet Socialist Republic between 1919 and 1923. It replaced the first Transcaucasian rouble at par and was subdivided into 100 kopecks ( k’ap’eik’i). It was replaced by the second Transcaucasian rouble after Georgia became part of the Transcaucasian Socialist Federative Soviet Republic.

Only paper money was issued, with the Democratic Republic producing denominations of between 50 kopecks and 5,000 maneti. Except for the 50 kopecks, the reverses of the notes bore the denomination in French and Russian. In 1922 the GSSR issued denominations between 5,000 and 5 million maneti.

Maneti, derived from the Latin moneta ("coin"), was used as the Georgian name for the Soviet rouble. The modern Georgian currency is the lari.

See also

 For an earlier Georgian currency, see Georgian abazi.
 For the current Georgian currency, see Georgian lari.

Modern obsolete currencies
Economic history of Georgia (country)
1919 establishments in Georgia (country)
1923 disestablishments